The 116th Cavalry Brigade Combat Team is the largest formation of the Idaho Army National Guard. It is headquartered at Gowen Field, Boise, Idaho. It has been reorganized into an Armored Brigade Combat Team (ABCT) but remains the only unit to be designated a "Cavalry Brigade Combat Team" by special appointment of the US Army. The 116th Cavalry Brigade Combat Team has units located throughout Idaho, Montana, Oregon, and Nevada. It was reorganized into a heavy armor brigade in 1989. Often referred to as the Snake River Brigade and formerly known as the 116th Armored Cavalry Regiment, the unit includes about 3,000 citizen-soldiers from Idaho.

In July 2016, the 116th CBCT took part in Exercise Saber Guardian, which involve deploying troop elements from Armenia, Azerbaijan, Bulgaria, Canada, Georgia, Moldova, Poland, Romania, Ukraine and the U.S.

Organization 
The 116th CBCT consists of the following units:
Headquarters and Headquarters Company, 116th Cavalry Brigade Combat Team (Idaho Army National Guard)
2nd Battalion (Combined Arms), 116th Cavalry Regiment (Idaho Army National Guard)
3rd Battalion (Combined Arms), 116th Cavalry Regiment (Oregon Army National Guard)
1st Battalion (Combined Arms), 163rd Cavalry Regiment (Montana Army National Guard)
1st Squadron (Armored Reconnaissance), 221st Cavalry Regiment (Nevada Army National Guard) (joined CBCT Nov. 2016)
1st Battalion, 148th Field Artillery Regiment (Idaho Army National Guard)
116th Brigade Engineer Battalion (Idaho Army National Guard) (re-organized from a special troops battalion and elements of the former 116th Engineer Battalion October 2016)
145th Brigade Support Battalion (Idaho, Montana, Nevada, and Oregon Army National Guard)

History 
The 116th Cavalry (Snake River Regiment) was constituted on 4 March 1920 in the Idaho National Guard as the 1st Cavalry. It organized between March – November 1920 in the valley of the Snake River. It was redesignated on 12 October 1921 as the 116th Cavalry (less 2nd and 3rd Squadrons): Headquarters was federally recognized on 11 February 1922 at Boise (2nd and 3rd Squadrons were allotted in 1929 to the Idaho National Guard). The location of headquarters changed on 15 March 1929 to Weiser; and on 9 December 1930 back to Boise. The 116th Cavalry (less 3rd Squadron) converted and was redesignated on 16 September 1940 to the 183rd Field Artillery (the 3rd Squadron concurrently converted and was redesignated as elements of the 148th Field Artillery—hereafter separate lineage).

The 183rd Field Artillery Battalion was inducted into federal service on 1 April 1941 at home stations. The regiment was broken up on 8 February 1943 and its elements were reorganized and redesignated as follows: Headquarters and Headquarters Battery as Headquarters and Headquarters Battery, 183 Field Artillery Group; the 1st Battalion as the 183rd Field Artillery Battalion (it inactivated on 30 October 1944, Camp Myles Standish, Massachusetts); the 2nd Battalion as the 951st Field Artillery Battalion (it inactivated on 13 October 1945 also at Camp Myles Standish.

The above units were reorganized as elements of the 183rd Infantry (Headquarters was federally recognized on 10 January 1947 at Twin Falls) and the 116th Mechanized Cavalry Reconnaissance Squadron (Headquarters was federally recognized on 8 January 1947 at Caldwell). The 183rd Infantry (less 3rd Battalion) and 116th Mechanized Cavalry Reconnaissance Squadron were consolidated, reorganized, and redesignated on 12 September 1949 as the 116th Armored Cavalry with headquarters at Twin Falls. The 3rd Battalion, 183rd Infantry, was concurrently converted and redesignated as the 116th Engineer Combat Battalion—hereafter separate lineage. The 3rd Squadron was allotted on 15 December 1967 to the Nevada Army National Guard; it was relieved on 11 May 1974 from allotment to the Nevada Army National Guard and allotted to the Oregon Army National Guard. The 1st Squadron was relieved on 1 May 1977 from allotment to the Idaho Army National Guard. The Attack Helicopter Company was allotted on 1 September 1975 to the Washington and Wyoming Army National Guard. The 116th was one of the four Army National Guard armored cavalry regiments during the 1980s, along with the 107th Armored Cavalry Regiment, 163rd Armored Cavalry Regiment and the 278th Armored Cavalry Regiment.

The unit reorganized and was redesignated on 1 September 1989 in the Idaho and Oregon Army National Guard as the 116th Cavalry, a parent regiment under the United States Army Regiment System, to consist of the 2nd and 3rd Battalions and Troop E, elements of the 116th Cavalry Brigade, and Troop F, and element of the 41st Infantry Brigade. The 116th Cavalry Brigade then joined the 4th Infantry Division as the roundout brigade. It was reorganized on 1 October 1995 to consist of the 2nd and 3rd Battalions, elements of the 116th Cavalry Brigade and in 1996 the brigade left the 4th Infantry Division.

Operation JOINT FORGE (SFOR XI) 
Approximately 300 Idaho and Montana Army National Guardsmen and women of the 116th served in Bosnia in 2001 and 2002. The 116th Cavalry Brigade, headquartered at Gowen Field, deployed approximately 100 soldiers in March 2002, returning in October 2002. The 116th was under the command and control of the Army's 25th Infantry Division, Hawaii, during the deployment. The 91st Division (Training Support) trained the 116th Cavalry Brigade prior to its deployment to Bosnia for Stabilization Force 11.

Operation Iraqi Freedom III 
In the early part of 2004 the 116th Cavalry Brigade was alerted for a mobilization to support Operation Iraqi Freedom. In June that year the entire brigade deployed for 18 months. The brigade spent the first six months at Fort Bliss, TX and Fort Polk, LA training for their combat mission.

The majority of the brigade arrived in Iraq late 2004. The 116th Cavalry Brigade was assigned to the northern part of Iraq, primarily in and around the oil-rich city of Kirkuk with elements occupying FOB Warrior, FOB McHenry and Gains Mills. For nearly a full year the soldiers of the 116th Cavalry Brigade conducted full spectrum operations in and around Kirkuk, stabilizing the region for national elections, and training the Iraqi Army and police forces.

The Iraq deployment marked the first time in the 116th Cavalry Brigade's history that the entire brigade had deployed together. This was also the first time that the 116th shoulder sleeve insignia was authorized to be worn as the Shoulder Sleeve Insignia – Former Wartime Service (often referred to as a combat patch).

As a cavalry unit, many soldiers serving in the brigade during the deployment were authorized to wear the gold combat spurs.

In November 2005 the 116th Cavalry Brigade redeployed to the United States. After redeployment the 116th Cavalry was officially redesignated from 116th Cavalry Brigade to 116th Cavalry Brigade Combat Team.

Operation New Dawn 
On 17 September 2010 the brigade began a 12-month deployment to Iraq, first traveling to Camp Shelby, Mississippi, for training and premobilization certification. After serving for a year in various locations in Iraq performing Force Protection missions, the brigade returned to Idaho in September 2011.

During their deployment, they conducted numerous Force Protection missions. The unit was spread all over Iraq, being the main controlling task force for the country, from late November 2010 to early September 2011, when they turned the country over to the Kentucky National Guard.

From Quick Reaction Force platoons, convoy security teams, to ECP operations as well as administrative and biometrics operations, UAV operations, the 116th play a major role in initiating Operation New Dawn and the overall turnover of the country to the Iraqi Government.

Insignia

Shoulder Sleeve Insignia 
Description: On a scarlet disc with a  yellow border  in diameter overall, a yellow sun emitting twelve rays surmounted by a blue horizontal wavy band bearing a yellow gliding snake.

Symbolism: The wavy band and the snake are taken from the coat of arms of the former organization, the 116th Armored Cavalry Regiment. The wavy band and snake represent the Snake River, and refer to the home area of the former organization, the Snake River Valley. The sun alludes to the state of Idaho, noted for the beauty of its sunrises. The name is taken from Shoshoni Indian words meaning " the sun comes down the mountain" or "it is morning." The predominant color, yellow, is representative of Armored Cavalry units.

Background: The shoulder sleeve insignia was originally approved for the 116th Armored Cavalry Regiment on 9 October 1967. The insignia was redesignated and the symbolism revised on 1 September 1989.

Distinctive Unit Insignia 

Symbolism: Yellow/gold is the color traditionally associated with Cavalry. The coiled rattlesnake epitomizes the unit's motto – capabilities and military preparedness. The snake also alludes to the unit's association with the old 116th Armored Cavalry Regiment. The five arrows symbolize the unit's five campaign credits during World War II as Field Artillery; scarlet and yellow/gold are the colors associated with Field Artillery.

Background: The distinctive unit insignia was authorized on 2 May 1989.

Notes

Armor 999 116
Armor 999 116
100 116
Cavalry 116
Military units and formations in Idaho
Military units and formations established in 1920